Richard Symonds may refer to:

Richard Symonds (academic) (1918–2006), writer and United Nations development officer
Richard Symonds (diarist) (1617–1660), English royalist and antiquary
Richard Symonds (footballer) (born 1959), Norwich City F.C.  footballer

See also 
Richard Symonds-Tayler (1897–1971), Royal Navy officer
Richard Simmons (disambiguation)
Symonds (disambiguation)